Masud Uddin Chowdhury is a retired lieutenant general of Bangladesh Army and a Jatiya Party (Ershad) politician. He is the former chief coordinator of the National Coordination Committee on Combating Corruption and Crime.

Career 
Chowdhury was an officer of the Jatiya Rakkhi Bahini and was made an Bangladesh Army officer after the Jatiya Rakhi Bahini was absorbed into the Army.

Chowdhury was appointed Director General of the Directorate General of Forces Intelligence in 2003 by the Bangladesh Nationalist Party government.

Chowdhury served as a Principal Staff Officer of Bangladesh Armed Forces Division. He also served as the General officer Commanding (GOC) of 9 Infantry Division and Area Commander of Savar Area and GOC 33 Infantry Division and Area Commander Comilla Area. In 2007, he was the chief coordinator of the National Coordination Committee on Combating Corruption and Crime during the caretaker government rule during the 2006–2008 Bangladeshi political crisis. He attended the 10th Annual Asia-Pacific Chiefs of Defence conference in the United States. Tarique Rahman, son for former Prime Minister Khaleda Zia, told United States Diplomat Geeta Pasi that he was tortured on the orders of Chowdhury in military custody. Pasi reported it was surprising as Chowdhury was believed to have been close to Zia's Bangladesh Nationalist Party.

In January 2008, Chowdhury was promoted to lieutenant general and appointed to the National Defence College. Chowdhury was the High Commissioner for Bangladesh to Australia from June 2008 to 2014. He founded Picasso restaurant in Dhaka.

In 2017, Chowdhury filed a case under section-57 of the Information and Communication Technology Act, 2006 against Afsan Chowdhury.

Chowdhury became the Member of Parliament for Feni-3 in 2018 by Jatiyo Party (Ershad) Ticket.

Chowdhury is the President of Baridhara Cosmopolitan Club Limited. He was re-elected president of the club in 2018.

Personal life 
Chowdhury's brother in law is Sayeed Iskander, who was the brother of former Prime Minister Khaleda Zia.

References

Living people
Bangladesh Army generals
11th Jatiya Sangsad members
Principal Staff Officers (Bangladesh)
1954 births
High Commissioners of Bangladesh to Australia